Phrynopus dagmarae is a species of frog in the family Strabomantidae. It is endemic to the Andes of Peru and only known from the Pachitea and Ambo Provinces in the Huánuco Region, from near the type locality. The specific name dagmarae honors Dagmar Schramm from Germany.

Description
The type series consists of females and juveniles; males are unknown. Adult females reach  in snout–vent length. The head is narrow and short. The snout is short and rounded. Tympanum is absent, and the supratympanic fold is weak. The fingers and toes have no webbing nor lateral fringes; the digital tips are slightly swollen. Skin of the dorsum is tuberculate; dorsolateral folds are present. Coloration is variable; dorsal and lateral ground coloration vary in various shades of reds, browns, and greens (cinnamon, grayish horn color, pale pinkish buff, light russet vinaceous, robin rufous, brick red, brussels brown, brownish olive, and peacock green). Ventral coloration is similarly variable (hair brown, lime green, straw yellow, glaucous, sulphur yellow to spectrum orange, Pratt's rufous). Some specimens have middorsal or dorsolateral stripes.

Habitat and conservation
It is an uncommon species. Agricultural activities, especially potato cultivation, are a serious threat to it. It is not known to occur in any protected areas.

References

dagmarae
Endemic fauna of Peru
Amphibians of Peru
Amphibians of the Andes
Frogs of South America
Amphibians described in 2002
Taxa named by Gunther Köhler
Taxonomy articles created by Polbot